Vittatispora is a fungus genus in the family Ceratostomataceae. This is a monotypic genus, containing the single species Vittatispora coorgii.

References

External links

Melanosporales
Monotypic Sordariomycetes genera
Taxa named by David Leslie Hawksworth